"Kids with Guns" is a song from the British virtual band Gorillaz' second album, Demon Days. It was released on 10 April 2006 in the United Kingdom as a double A-side as the fourth and final singles from the album. "Kids with Guns" and its other A-side "El Mañana", reached number 27 upon its release in the United Kingdom, a significantly lower position than its predecessors.

"Kids with Guns" features Neneh Cherry on guest vocals. A remix by Hot Chip was included on the release of The Inbetweeners Soundtrack in 2009.

Overview
"Kids with Guns" was inspired by a child at Damon Albarn's daughter's school, who had arrived one day with a knife. Albarn said, "A nice boy just decided to pick up a knife and show it to his friends at lunchtime. It's a very real problem, but I'm not treating it as a problem. It's part of the brutalization of a generation that's going on at the moment."

Music video
Although "Kids with Guns" does not have an official promo video, live visuals were shown during the Demon Days Live show at Manchester Opera House in November 2005. The visuals are a slideshow of guns, appearing in red, white and black. Sometimes a "23 mm" sign or a slide of the guns is positioned to make a windmill, representing Noodle's floating island.

On The Singles Collection DVD, the video used for the song was the live performance from Demon Days Live at the Manchester Opera House.

Track listings
UK CD single
 "Kids with Guns" – 3:45
 "El Mañana" – 3:50
 "Stop the Dams" – 5:39

UK DVD single
 "El Mañana" (music video) – 3:54
 "Kids with Guns" (music video) – 3:46
 "Don't Get Lost in Heaven" (Original Demo Version) – 2:29
 "El Mañana" (animatic) – 3:57

UK 7-inch single
 "Kids with Guns" – 3:45
 "El Mañana" – 3:50

European CD single
 "Kids with Guns" – 3:45
 "El Mañana" – 3:50
 "Stop the Dams" – 5:39
 "El Mañana" (music video) – 3:54

Japanese CD single
 "El Mañana" – 3:50
 "Kids with Guns" – 3:45
 "Stop the Dams" – 5:39
 "Don't Get Lost in Heaven" (Original Demo Version) – 2:29
 "El Mañana" (music video) – 3:54

US digital single
 "El Mañana" – 3:50
 "Hong Kong" (Live in Manchester) – 6:36

US digital E.P.
 "El Mañana" – 3:50
 "Stop the Dams" – 5:39
 "Hong Kong" (Live in Manchester) – 6:36
 "Kids with Guns" (music video) – 3:46
 "El Mañana" (Live in Harlem video) – 3:59

Personnel
 Damon Albarn – vocals, guitars, keyboards
 Neneh Cherry – additional vocals
 Danger Mouse – drum programming, mixing
 James Dring – drums, drum programming
 Jason Cox – mixing, engineering
 Steve Sedgwick – mixing assistance
 Howie Weinberg – mastering

Charts

Release history

References

External links
 Release - Kids with Guns Toshiba EMI  (Archived) - Japanese release page

2006 singles
Gorillaz songs
British new wave songs
Song recordings produced by Danger Mouse (musician)
Songs written by Damon Albarn
2005 songs
Parlophone singles